The Massif de la Hotte is a mountain range in southwestern Haiti, on the Tiburon Peninsula. About 2.5 million years ago, Massif de la Hotte was separated from the Massif de la Selle by a deep, wide sea channel, and formed a separate island. This resulted in a hotbed of endemism in la Hottes bird, plant, and reptile communities. The Massif de la Hotte is subdivided into the Oriental la Hotte in the East, the central la Hotte and the Occidental la Hotte on the Western tip of the Tiburon peninsula. The Occidental la Hotte is relatively remote and is one of the most biologically diverse and significant areas of all of Hispaniola. It also supports some of the last stands of Haiti's dense cloud forest on its peaks.

Haiti has a World Heritage Site located here. In the wake of the 2010 Haiti earthquake, UNESCO's World Heritage Program is helping Haiti assess the damage.

Biodiversity and conservation
Occidental la Hottes is the highest and biologically most diverse part of Massif de la Hotte. Rising to a peak level of approximately 7700 ft (2347 m) in Pic Macaya; Haiti's second highest peak, the Massif's high and fluctuating elevations supports some of Hispaniola's highest levels of biological diversity and endemism. 

Notable conservation areas in the  Massif de la Hotte include five National Parks, five  Habitat/Species Management Areas, two Protected Area with sustainable use of natural resources and the largest cave on the Caribbean islands Grotte Marie Jeanne. 
The National Parks are: Pic Macaya National Park, Grande Colline National Park, Deux Mamelles National Park, Grand Bois National Park and Ile a Vache National Park. The Habitat/Species Management Areas are: Grosse Caye / Zone humide d'Aquin, Olivier / Zanglais, Pointe Abacou, Fond de Cayes, la Cahouane.
The two Protected Area with sustainable use of natural resources are: Jeremie - Abricot and Barcaderes Caymites.

Conservation International recognizes the region as one of the most conservation-urgent in the world in which 13 of Hispaniola's most critically endangered species (all amphibians) occur. Among the most critically endangered frog species are Eleutherodactylus chlorophenax and Eleutherodactylus parapelates, two frog species endemic to Haiti. The Hispaniolan trogon has a recognized presence in the region.

La Hotte Biosphere Reserve
The La Hotte Biosphere Reserve was designated by UNESCO in 2016. The reserve covers an area of 435,193.5 ha (terrestrial and marine), with a core area of 117,119 ha (terrestrial 52,781.5 ha, marine 64,337.5 ha), a buffer zone of 185,027.5 ha (terrestrial 130,074.5 ha, marine: 54,953 ha), and a transition area of 133,047 ha (terrestrial 82,423 ha, marine: 50,624 ha).

See also
Geography of Haiti

World Conservation Monitoring Centre

References

Mountain ranges of Haiti
Grand'Anse (department)
Sud (department)
Tropical and subtropical moist broadleaf forests
Biota of Hispaniola
Hispaniolan moist forests